Garmarud-e Olya (also Romanized as Garmārūd-e ‘Olyā; also known as Garmārūd-e Bālā) is a village in Moallem Kalayeh Rural District, Rudbar-e Alamut District, Qazvin County, Qazvin Province, Iran. At the 2006 census, its population was 124, in 35 families.

References 

Populated places in Qazvin County